This article lists various football records in relation to the Morocco national football team. The page is updated where necessary after each Morocco match, and is correct as of 31 May 2018.

FIFA World Cup

Matches

Africa Cup of Nations Group

Matches

Head-to-head performance
Correct as of 13 June 2022.

(*) includes (**) includes (***) includes

Appearances

Goals

Captains

References 

Morocco national football team